WAUG (750 AM) is a radio station broadcasting a mainstream urban format. Licensed to New Hope, North Carolina, United States, the station serves the Raleigh–Durham area.  The station is owned by St. Augustine's University and features programming from American Urban Radio Networks and the Radio One-owned Syndication One.  WAUG radio is a daytime-only operation, leaving the air at sunset to prevent interference to 50,000-watt WSB in Atlanta, the Class A clear-channel station on 750 AM.

The university also runs a low-powered TV station, WAUG-LD (channel 8). WAUG-LD is carried by Spectrum Cable on digital cable channel 168 in Raleigh.

History
WAUG "Power 750" began broadcasting in 1987 from the campus of Saint Augustine's University. In October 2006, the station switched primarily to a talk format aimed at the black community.  Shows include the nationally syndicated News One Now with Roland Martin, Keepin' It Real with Al Sharpton and Biz Talk with Josh Smith.  The station also carries football games from the Washington Redskins as well as St. Augustine's University Sports including the CIAA Basketball Tournament.  The station is also the flagship for From The Press Box To The Press Row, a sports talk show focused on Black college sports which is heard on syndicated stations through the mid-Atlantic region from Pennsylvania to Georgia.

In October 2018 WAUG changed their format from talk to Mainstream urban, branded as "Hot 97.9" (simulcast on FM translator W250AZ 97.9 FM Raleigh).

Previous logo

References

External links

AUG (AM)
St. Augustine's University (North Carolina)
Radio stations established in 1987
1987 establishments in North Carolina
Mainstream urban radio stations in the United States
AUG